The Valea Locii (also: Valea Locei) is a left tributary of the river Nicolina in Romania. It flows into the Nicolina in Lunca Cetățuii. The Bârca and Ciurbești dams are located on this river.

References

Rivers of Romania
Rivers of Iași County